Chafarinas's skink (Chalcides parallelus) is a species of skink in the family Scincidae. It is found in Algeria, Morocco, and Spain. Its natural habitats are Mediterranean-type shrubby vegetation, rocky areas, rocky shores, sandy shores, and plantations. It is threatened by habitat loss.

References
Geniez, P., Mateo, J.A., Joger, U., Pleguezuelos, J., Slimani, T., El Mouden, E.H. & Martinez Solano, I. 2009. https://dx.doi.org/10.2305/IUCN.UK.2009.RLTS.T61484A12478003.en.]

Chalcides
Reptiles described in 1901
Taxa named by François Doumergue
Taxonomy articles created by Polbot